

Friedrich-Wilhelm Hauck (10 January 1897 – 15 April 1979) was a German general during World War II who commanded several corps. He was a recipient of the Knight's Cross of the Iron Cross.

Biography  
Under his command, the 305th Infantry Division may have committed war crimes in Italy, but he was never charged.

He was taken prisoner of war during the surrender of Army Group C on 2 May 1945 in Italy. 
Released from US captivity at the beginning of 1948, he worked for the Evangelical Relief Organization, as Eugen Gerstenmaier's office manager. 

During 6 years, he wrote on behalf of the United States Army and with the collaboration of six other former German generals, "The Operations of the German Army Groups on the Eastern Front 1941–1945, Southern Territory". With an assessment by Colonel-General Franz Halder, and a letter of thanks from the Commander-in-Chief of the United States Army in Germany, he transferred the work (16 volumes) to the Federal Archives-Military Archives in Freiburg im Breisgau.

Awards and decorations

 Knight's Cross of the Iron Cross on 11 June 1944 as Generalleutnant and commander of 305. Infanterie-Division

References

Citations

Bibliography

 

1897 births
1979 deaths
Military personnel from Wrocław
People from the Province of Silesia
German Army generals of World War II
Generals of Artillery (Wehrmacht)
German Army personnel of World War I
Recipients of the clasp to the Iron Cross, 1st class
Recipients of the Knight's Cross of the Iron Cross
Commanders of the Order of the Star of Romania
German prisoners of war in World War II held by the United Kingdom
Prussian Army personnel
Reichswehr personnel
Nazi war criminals